Bibi Russell is a Bangladeshi fashion designer and former international model.

Career
Russell was born in 1950 in Chittagong, Bangladesh to Mokhlessur Rahman and Shamsun Nahar. She grew up in Dhaka studying in Kamrunnessa Govt Girls High School and Later College of Home Economics, Azimpur, Dhaka. She earned a graduate degree in fashion from London College of Fashion in 1975. In the next five years, she worked as a model for different magazines including Vogue, Cosmopolitan and Harper's Bazaar. She also worked as a fashion model in fashion shows until 1994, working with Yves Saint Laurent, Kenzo, Karl Lagerfeld and Giorgio Armani. Returning to Bangladesh in 1994, Russell opened a fashion house named Bibi Productions, which fused indigenous Bengali cultural elements into her design. As of 2004, her company employed 35,000 weavers in rural Bangladesh.

Fashion shows
With UNESCO support, Bibi Russell organized her first European fashion show (pioneering event by an South Asian female) in Paris in 1996. She also organized fashion show, The Colours of Bangladesh, in Spain in 1997. In 2016, she participated in India at India Runway Week seventh edition where she presented her latest collection on Rajasthan khadi. Bibi's collection was celebrated by the Indian fashion industry. Recently (in year 2016 & 18), she showcased her collection for the opening show at the third biggest fashion week of India, Indian Federation for Fashion Development's India Runway Week Season 7.

Filmography
Moner Manush (2009)

Awards
Bangladesh National Film Award for Best Costume Design - 2009 for Moner Manush
Russell was rewarded Cross of Officer of the Order of Queen Isabella by the King of Spain. It was presented by Spanish Ambassador to Bangladesh, Arturo Perez Martinez. Russell is also a Fellow of Bangla Academy. The Asiaweek magazine highlighted her as "One of the 20 people to watch in the Millennium". She was awarded the Honorary Fellowship of the London Institute in 1999. UNESCO awarded her the title Designer for Development in 1999. She also got the title of Artist for Peace by the UNESCO in 2001 and the Peace Prize by the United Nations Associations of Spain in 2004.

References

External links
Tribute to Bibi Russell and Fashion for Development Project
UNESCO Wide Angle interview: "Bibi Russell: handicrafts people have magic in their fingers"

Living people
Bangladeshi female models
People from Chittagong
Bangladeshi businesspeople
Honorary Fellows of Bangla Academy
Recipients of Begum Rokeya Padak
Bangladeshi fashion
Bangladeshi fashion designers
Fashion stylists
Best Costume Design National Film Award (Bangladesh) winners
1950 births
Bangladeshi costume designers
Bangladeshi women fashion designers